The 2008 Formula 3 Euro Series season was the sixth championship year of Europe's premier Formula Three series. The season was dominated by 21-year-old German Nico Hülkenberg, who won seven of the season's ten feature races amassing 76 of his total of 85 championship points on Saturday afternoons. He won the championship by 35.5 points from early frontrunner Edoardo Mortara as the 2007's rookie cup winner's season somewhat tailed off after the Norisring, scoring just 9.5 points in the final twelve races compared to Hülkenberg's 60. Jules Bianchi's strong finish to the season, including a win in the final race at Hockenheim and coupled with Renger van der Zande's fifth place and Mika Mäki's ninth place, it allowed the 2008 Ultimate Masters winner to finish third in the championship, a point ahead of both van der Zande and Mäki.

Drivers and teams

Driver changes
 Changed Teams
 Yann Clairay: Signature-Plus → SG Formula
 Dani Clos: Signature-Plus → Prema Powerteam
 Tom Dillmann: ASM Formule 3 → SG Formula
 James Jakes: Manor Motorsport → ART Grand Prix
 Franck Mailleux: Manor Motorsport → Signature-Plus

 Entering/Re-Entering Formula 3 Euro Series
 Jules Bianchi: French Formula Renault Championship & Eurocup Formula Renault 2.0 (SG Formula) → ART Grand Prix
 Sam Bird: British Formula 3 Championship (Carlin Motorsport) → Manor Motorsport
 Niall Breen: British Formula 3 Championship (Carlin Motorsport) → Manor Motorsport
 Daniel Campos-Hull: Formula BMW ADAC (Eifelland Racing) →  HBR Motorsport
 Cong Fu Cheng: British Formula 3 Championship National Class (Performance Racing Europe AB) → RC Motorsport
 Stefano Coletti: Italian Formula Renault Championship & Eurocup Formula Renault 2.0 (Epsilon Euskadi) → Signature-Plus
 Peter Elkmann: Sabbatical →  RC Motorsport
 Rodolfo González: British Formula 3 Championship (T-Sport) → Carlin Motorsport
 Erik Janiš: FIA GT3 European Championship (S-Berg Racing) → Mücke Motorsport
 Brendon Hartley: Italian Formula Renault Championship & Eurocup Formula Renault 2.0 (Epsilon Red Bull Team) → RC Motorsport
 Charlie Kimball: Formula Renault 3.5 Series (Victory Engineering) → Prema Powerteam
 Jens Klingmann: Formula BMW ADAC (Eifelland Racing) →  RC Motorsport
 Michael Klein: German Formula Three Championship Throphy Class (HS Technik Motorsport) → Jo Zeller Racing
 Jon Lancaster: French Formula Renault Championship & Eurocup Formula Renault 2.0 (SG Formula) → ART Grand Prix
 Mika Mäki: Italian Formula Renault Championship & Eurocup Formula Renault 2.0 (Epsilon Red Bull Team) → Mücke Motorsport
 Oliver Oakes: Formula Renault 2.0 Northern European Cup & Eurocup Formula Renault 2.0 (Motopark Academy) → Carlin Motorsport
 Kazuya Oshima: All-Japan Formula Three Championship (Toyota Team Tom's) → Manor Motorsport
 Nelson Panciatici: French Formula Renault Championship & Eurocup Formula Renault 2.0 (SG Formula) → RC Motorsport
 Richard Philippe: Formula Renault 3.5 Series (Fortec Motorsport) → Carlin Motorsport
 Martin Plowman: Italian Formula Renault Championship & Eurocup Formula Renault 2.0 (Prema Powerteam) → RC Motorsport
 Stéphane Richelmi: Italian Formula Renault Championship & Eurocup Formula Renault 2.0 (Thierry Boutsen Racing) → Barazi-Epsilon
 Daniel Ricciardo: Italian Formula Renault Championship & Eurocup Formula Renault 2.0 (RP Motorsport) → SG Formula
 Koudai Tsukakoshi: All-Japan Formula Three Championship (Honda Team Real) → Manor Motorsport
 Christian Vietoris: German Formula Three Championship (Josef Kaufmann Racing) → Mücke Motorsport
 Frédéric Vervisch: German Formula Three Championship (JB Motorsport) → RC Motorsport
 Henkie Waldschmidt: Italian Formula Renault Championship & Eurocup Formula Renault 2.0 (Prema Powerteam) → SG Formula
 Robert Wickens: Atlantic Championship (Red Bull/Team Forsythe) → Signature-Plus

 Leaving Formula 3 Euro Series
 Sergey Afanasyev: HBR Motorsport → International Formula Master (JD Motorsport)
 Cyndie Allemann: Manor Motorsport → Firestone Indy Lights (American Spirit Racing)
 Sébastien Buemi: ASL Mücke Motorsport → GP2 Series (Trust Team Arden)
 Yelmer Buurman: Manor Motorsport → GP2 Series (Trust Team Arden)
 Carlo van Dam: RC Motorsport → All-Japan Formula Three Championship (Petronas Team Tom's)
 Michael Devaney: Ultimate Motorsport → British Formula 3 Championship (Ultimate Motorsport)
 Romain Grosjean: ASM Formule 3 → GP2 Series (ART Grand Prix)
 Esteban Guerrieri: Ultimate Motorsport → Formula Renault 3.5 Series (Ultimate Signature)
 Euan Hankey: HS Technik Motorsport → Sabbatical
 Michael Herck: Bas Leinders Junior Racing Team → GP2 Series (David Price Racing)
 Marco Holzer: AM-Holzer Rennsport → Porsche Carrera Cup Germany (UPS Porsche Junior Team)
 Kamui Kobayashi: ASM Formule 3 → GP2 Series (DAMS)
 Michael Patrizi: Prema Powerteam → V8 Supercars (Ford Rising Stars Racing)
 Edoardo Piscopo: ASL Mücke Motorsport → Italian Formula Three Championship (Team Ghinzani)
 Filip Salaquarda: HBR Motorsport → International Formula Master (Team ISR)
 Tim Sandtler: Jo Zeller Racing → International Formula Master (Team ISR)
 Harald Schlegelmilch: HS Technik Motorsport → International Formula Master (Trident Racing)
 Jonathan Summerton: RC Motorsport →  Atlantic Championship (Newman Wachs Racing)

Calendar

Season standings

Drivers Standings
Points are awarded as follows:

Note: In the second races at the Norisring, the Bugatti Circuit and the October Hockenheim meeting, due to insufficient distance covered, half points were awarded.

† — Drivers did not finish the race, but were classified as they completed over 90% of the race distance.

 Pole-winners in bold; race 1 pole-winners earn one point (not awarded at Pau or Brands).
 Drivers achieving fastest lap in italics. No points awarded.

Rookie Cup
Rookie drivers are only eligible for the Rookie Cup title if they have not previously competed in a national or international Formula 3 championship.

Team's standings

Nations Cup

Notes

References

Formula 3 Euro Series seasons
Euro Series
Formula 3 Euro Series